Holly Webb (born 1976 in London) is a British children's writer. She studied Classics at Newnham College at Cambridge University, Byzantine and Medieval Art History at the Courtauld Institute of Art, and then worked as an editor until 2005. She lives outside Reading with her husband Jon and her three children, Ash, Robin and William.

Her works have been translated into 31 different languages, including Russian and Polish. Her books are published by Scholastic, Stripes, Orchard and Nosy Crow. 

According to Russia Beyond the Headlines, she was one of the 10 most popular children's writers in Russia in 2016. 97 books by her with a total print run of 595,000 copies were published there that year.

In Kazakhstan, her book Maisie Hitchins and the Case of the Phantom Cat was the fifth best-selling book for teenagers of 2017.

She is also very popular in Poland. It was estimated that her Animal Stories series, targeted at girls aged 6–10, sold over 500,000 copies in that country up to February 2013.

Works 
Holly has written 130 books, mostly aimed at children aged 5-10 years old.

Animal Stories

 Lost in the Storm
Alfie All Alone
Sam the Stolen Puppy
Max the Missing Puppy
Sky the Unwanted Kitten
Timmy in Trouble
Ginger the Stray Kitten
Harry the Homeless Puppy
Buttons the Runaway Puppy
Alone in the Night
Ellie the Homesick Puppy
Jess the Lonely Puppy
Misty the Abandoned Kitten
Oscar’s Lonely Christmas
Lucy the Poorly Puppy
Smudge the Stolen Kitten
The Rescued Puppy
The Kitten Nobody Wanted
The Lost Puppy
The Frightened Kitten
The Secret Puppy
The Abandoned Puppy
The Missing Kitten
The Puppy Who Was Left Behind
The Kidnapped Kitten
The Scruffy Puppy
The Brave Kitten
The Forgotten Puppy
The Secret Kitten
A Home for Molly
Sammy the Shy Kitten
The Seaside Puppy
The Curious Kitten
Monty the Sad Puppy
The Homeless Kitten
A Kitten Called Tigger
The Unwanted Puppy
Lost in the Snow
The Rescued Kitten
Cookie the Deserted Puppy
Lucky the Rescued Puppy
The Shelter Puppy
The Perfect Kitten
The Puppy Who Couldn't Sleep
The Loneliest Kitten
The Mystery Kitten

Animal magic

Mouse magic
Bird magic
Pony magic
Rabbit magic
Hamster magic
Dog magic
Cat magic

Emily Feather

 Emily Feather and the Enchanted Door
 Emily Feather and the Secret Mirror
 Emily Feather and the Chest of Charms
 Emily Feather and the Starlit Staircase

Furry Friends

 Sophie's Squeaky Surprise
 Marshmallow Magic
 Peril in Paris

Lily

 Lily
 Lily and the Shining Dragon
 Lily and the Prisoner of Magic
 Lily and the Traitor's Spell

Magic Molly

 The Purple Butterfly (Early Readers)
 The Clever Little Kitten
 The Witch's Kitten
 The Good Luck Duck
 The Secret Pony
 The Shy Piglet
 The Wish Puppy
 The Invisible Bunny

Magical Venice

 The Water Horse
 The Mermaid's Sister
 The Mask maker's Daughter
 The Girl of Glass

Maisie Hitchins

 The Case of the Vanishing Emerald
 The Case of the Phantom Cat
 The Case of the Feathered Mask
 The Case of the Secret Tunnel
 The Case of the Spilled Ink
 The Case of the Stolen Sixpence
 The Case of the Blind Beetle
 The Case of the Weeping Mermaid

Maya, Izzy, Poppy & Emily

 Maya's Secret
 Izzy's River
 Poppy's Garden
 Emily's Dream

My Naughty Little Puppy

 New Tricks for Rascal
 A Home for Rascal
 Playtime for Rascal
 Rascal's Sleepover Fun
 Rascal's Seaside Adventure
 Rascal's Festive Fun
 Rascal the Star
 Rascal and the Wedding

Rose

 Rose
 Rose and the Lost Princess
 Rose and the Magician's Mask
 Rose and the Silver Ghost

The Hounds of Penhallow Hall

 The Moonlight Statue
 The Lost Treasure
 The Hidden Staircase
 The Secrets Tree

Triplets

Becky's Terrible Term
Annabel's Perfect Party
Katie's Big Match
Becky's Problem Pet
Annabel's Starring Role
Katie's Secret Admirer
Becky's Dress Disaster

Wintry Tales

 The Snow Bear
 The Reindeer Girl
 The Winter Wolf
 The Storm Leopards
 The Snow Cat
The Storm Dog
 Frost

Shine (Reprint of Stage School under a different publisher) Chloe Centre StageStandalone Books

 A Cat Called Penguin
 The Chocolate Dog
 Looking for Bear
 A Tiger Tale
 The Truffle Mouse
 Return to the Secret Garden
 The Midnight Panda
 The Pocket Dog
 The Princess and the Suffragette
 Evie's War

Picture Books

 Little Puppy Lost
 The Snow Princess
The Snow Princess and the Winter rescue

References

External links 

 
 Book reviews at The Guardian website
Rose and the Magician's Mask
 Magic Molly: the Clever Little Kitten
 The Reindeer Girl
 Emily Feather and the Secret Mirror

1976 births
British children's writers
Living people